Jorge Mario Murillo Valdes is a Colombian swimmer. He competed at the 2015 World Aquatics Championships and at the 2016 Summer Olympics in Rio de Janeiro. He competed at the 2020 Summer Olympics.

References

External links

1991 births
Living people
Colombian male swimmers
Olympic swimmers of Colombia
Swimmers at the 2016 Summer Olympics
Swimmers at the 2020 Summer Olympics
Place of birth missing (living people)
South American Games gold medalists for Colombia
South American Games medalists in swimming
Competitors at the 2018 South American Games
Competitors at the 2022 South American Games
Swimmers at the 2011 Pan American Games
Swimmers at the 2015 Pan American Games
Swimmers at the 2019 Pan American Games
Central American and Caribbean Games medalists in swimming
Central American and Caribbean Games gold medalists for Colombia
Competitors at the 2014 Central American and Caribbean Games
Competitors at the 2018 Central American and Caribbean Games
Pan American Games competitors for Colombia
20th-century Colombian people
21st-century Colombian people